Jičíněves is a municipality and village in Jičín District in the Hradec Králové Region of the Czech Republic. It has about 600 inhabitants.

Administrative parts
Villages of Bartoušov, Dolany, Keteň, Labouň and Žitětín are administrative parts of Jičíněves.

Gallery

References

External links

Villages in Jičín District